Stephen Willis (born 12 December 1986) in the Cook Islands is a footballer who plays as a midfielder. He currently plays for Nikao Sokattack F.C. in the Cook Islands Round Cup and the Cook Islands national football team.

References

1986 births
Living people
Cook Islands international footballers
Association football midfielders
Cook Island footballers